Ivo Vinco (8 November 1927 – 8 June 2014) was an Italian bass opera singer who enjoyed a successful international career.

Born in Bosco Chiesanuova, Vinco first studied at the Liceo Musicale in Verona with Madama Zilotti, then at the opera school of the Teatro alla Scala in Milan with Ettore Campogalliani. He made his professional debut in Verona, as Ramfis in Aida, in 1954. He quickly sang all over Italy (Milan, Rome, Naples, Turin, Venice, Bologna, Palermo, Parma, Florence et al.). 

He began an international career which took him to Vienna, Munich, Berlin, Hamburg, Moscow, Paris, Monte Carlo, Barcelona, Lisbon, Mexico City, Buenos Aires, San Francisco, Chicago and New York, where he made his debut at the Metropolitan Opera in 1969. During the 1962-63 winter season he sang the crucially important role of Oroveso, chief of the Druids, in Bellini's Norma during the I Festival de Festivales de Opera of the Gran Teatro del Liceo in Barcelona. But Vinco sang all the great bass roles of the Italian repertory in addition to Oroveso, including in Raimondo, Sparafucile, Ferrando, Fiesco, Padre Guardiano, Gran Inquisitore and Alvise, and can be heard in a number of complete Italian opera recordings.

Personal life
He was married for many years to mezzo-soprano Fiorenza Cossotto, with whom he had a son, Roberto.

External links
 Ivo Vinco at Operissimo.com
 Interview with Fiorenza Cossotto and Ivo Vinco by Bruce Duffie, September 29, 1983

References

1927 births
2014 deaths
Operatic basses
Musicians from Veneto
Italian basses
Place of death missing
20th-century Italian male opera singers
People from Bosco Chiesanuova